Bingley (population 13,675 - 2001 UK census, 18,294 at the 2011 Census) is a Ward in Bradford Metropolitan District in the county of West Yorkshire, England, named after the town of Bingley around which it is centred.

As well as the town of Bingley the ward includes the conurbated villages of Eldwick, Gilstead, the slightly detached village of Micklethwaite and part of Crossflatts (the rest of which is located in Keighley East). The ward also extends to cover a substantial section of the moorland above the town.

References

External links
BCSP (Internet Explorer only)
BBC election results
Council ward profile (pdf)

Wards of Bradford
Bingley